The 1st Hollywood Critics Association Creative Arts Awards, presented by the Hollywood Critics Association, took place on February 24, 2023. The winners were announced on the official HCA Facebook, Instagram and Twitter, while the 6th Hollywood Critics Association Film Awards took place on the same day at the Beverly Wilshire Hotel, Beverly Hills. The nominations were announced on the HCA official YouTube channel and app on December 8, 2022.

Everything Everywhere All at Once led the nominations with six, followed by The Batman and Top Gun: Maverick with five each. The former and Babylon won the most awards with two wins each.

A shortlist committee, led by Erik Anderson, AwardsWatch contributor and HCA member, was created and tasked with generating twelve category shortlists for the HCA Creative Arts Awards. Six more HCA members worked alongside Anderson to build and shape this year's shortlists. Once the lists were finalized, the shortlists were sent out to the HCA membership and were used to vote on this year's nominees.

Winners and nominees
Winners are listed first and highlighted with boldface.

Films with multiple wins
The following films received multiple awards:

Films with multiple nominations
The following films received multiple nominations:

See also
 2nd Hollywood Critics Association TV Awards
 6th Hollywood Critics Association Film Awards
 5th Hollywood Critics Association Midseason Film Awards

References

External links
 

2022 film awards
2022 in Los Angeles
2022 in American cinema
2023 awards in the United States
Creative Arts Awards 01